Fana is a borough of the city of Bergen, Vestland county, Norway.

Fana or fanaa may also refer to:

 Fana (Sufism), the Sufi term for "annihilation of the self"

People
 Saint Fana (c. 354–395), Egyptian Christian hermit
 Anwar Farrukhabadi or "Fana" (1928–2011), Indian Sufi poet

Surname
 Fana-Khusrau (fl. 1040), son of the Buyid amir Majd al-Dawla of Iran
 Abu Ali Fana-Khusrau (died 1094), son of the Buyid ruler Abu Kalijar
 Frozan Fana (born 1969), Afghan physician and politician
 Hailu Fana (born 1967), Ethiopian cyclist
 Jonathan Faña (born 1987), Dominican footballer
 Karim Aït-Fana (born 1989), French-Moroccan footballer
 Mohammad Jan Fana (born 1932), Afghan poet, writer, and artist
 Mzonke Fana (born 1973), South African boxer
  (born 1966), television presenter; see 2009 Anugerah Bintang Popular

Given name
 Fana Ashby (born 1981), Trinidadian sprinter
 Fana Hlongwane, South African politician and businessman
 Fana Kochovska (1927–2004), Macedonian communist, fighter and national hero
 Fana Mokoena (born 1971), South African actor

Characters
 Fana (Black Clover), a character in the manga series Black Clover

Places
 Fana (municipality), a former municipality in Hordaland county, Norway
 Fana Gymnas,  public high school
 Fana Stadion, a multi-use stadium at Rådal
 Fana prosti, deanery
 Fana Church, a parish church
 Fana Island, one of the Southwest Islands of Palau
 Fana, Mali, in the commune of Guegneka, Koulikoro Region, Mali
 Fana, the Friulian name of the town of Fanna, Friuli Venezia Giulia, Italy
Federally Administered Northern Areas, former name of the northern areas of Pakistan administered by the federal government outside the four provinces, now it called Gilgit-Baltistan.

Art and entertainment
 Fanaa (2006 film), a 2006 Indian romantic crime drama
 Fanaa (2010 film), a 2010 Indian drama film
 "Fanaa", a song from the soundtrack of the 2004 Indian film Yuva
 Fana Broadcasting Corporation, Ethiopian news media company
 Fana TV, a satellite television news channel in Ethiopia owned by FBC

Sports 
 Fana IL, multi-sport club in Fana, Bergen, Norway
 Fana Håndball, women's handball team of Fana IL
 FIK BFG Fana, a Norwegian athletics club from Fana in Bergen

FANA

 Federation of Arab News Agencies
 National Air Force of Angola
 Fiji American National Association, a group for Fijian Americans
 fana, Latin plural of fanum, a sacred precinct or shrine

See also
 Fanai, a village in Khoy County, West Azerbaijan Province, Iran
 Fanas, a former municipality in Graubünden, Switzerland
 Fane (disambiguation)